Hydrangeic acid is a stilbenoid found in the leaves of Hydrangea macrophylla.

Hydrangeic acid is being investigated as a possible antidiabetic drug as it significantly lowered blood glucose, triglyceride and free fatty acid levels in laboratory animals.

See also 
 Lunularic acid, the corresponding dihydrostilbenoid also found in H. macrophylla

References 

Stilbenoids
Salicylic acids